Galician Americans are Americans of Galician descent.

The Galicians (Galician: Galegos; Spanish: Gallegos) are a nationality, cultural and ethnolinguistic group whose historic homeland is Galicia, in the north-west of the Iberian Peninsula (Europe). Galician and Castilian are the official languages of the Autonomous Community of Galicia.

Galician migration to North America took place mainly between 1868 and 1930, although there was a second smaller wave in the late 1940s and 1950s, when Galicians managed to form a small community in Newark.

There are some notable Galician-born persons who have lived or are now residing in the US, such as musician Cristina Pato or teacher Anxo Brea, but they may do so temporarily and without being naturalized American. The list below refers to US-born or US citizens of Galician ancestry.

Notable people

Estevez family
Joe Estevez (born 1946)
Martin Sheen (born Ramón Gerardo Antonio Estévez, 1940)
Emilio Estevez (born 1962; son of Martin)
Ramon Estevez (born 1963; son of Martin)
Charlie Sheen (born Carlos Irwin Estévez, 1965; son of Martin)
Renée Estevez (born 1967; daughter of Martin)
Jerry Garcia (August 1, 1942 – August 9, 1995) musician and songwriter.
Ramón Verea Spanish journalist, engineer and writer. Inventor of a calculator with an internal multiplication table
Yglesias family.
Jose Yglesias (November 29, 1919 – November 7, 1995) American novelist and journalist. Yglesias was born in the Ybor City section of Tampa, Florida, and was of Cuban and Spanish descent. His father was from Galicia.
Rafael Yglesias Rafael Yglesias (born May 12, 1954, New York) American novelist and screenwriter. His parents were the novelists Jose Yglesias and Helen Yglesias.
Matthew Yglesias Matthew Yglesias (born May 18, 1981) American economics journalist and political blogger.
Perez Hilton (Mario Armando Lavandeira, Jr.) (born March 23, 1978) known professionally as Perez Hilton, American blogger and television personality.
Carmen Fariña teacher and politician.
Octavio Vazquez (born 1972) composer and professor at Nazareth College (New York).
Richard Fariña (March 8, 1937 – April 30, 1966) American folksinger, songwriter, poet and novelist.

References

External links
Centre for Galician Studies CUNY
Galician Studies Research Group UW
Casa Galicia NYC
Casa Galicia de Nova York (Unidade galega de EE.UU)
Galicia Restaurant NYC
Casa Galicia's St. Patrick's Day Parade, YouTube

 
European-American society
Galician diaspora
Spanish American